Zarobai Munara, commonly known as Zarobi, is a historical village and Union Council of Swabi District in the Khyber Pakhtunkhwa province of Pakistan. It is located at 34°2′0N 72°34′0E with an altitude of 321 metres (1056 feet).

This is one of the big villages of Swabi District in terms of population. This village is distributed in two main parts: Porta cham (Abu sayd) and Khakata cham (Akhun Sayad).

Khel (division) 

This village is divided in two main parts, Abu sayad and Akhoon sayad, and eight sectors (Mohalla's, Tapa, Khels, cham)

 Mohammad khel (Makhkey & Sha)
 Sufi khel and Dranj wal
 Khodo khel and chamle wal 
 Bhai Khel and Sheri Khel
 Bozar khel and Mosra khel
 Daka khel and Jatta khel
 Khelji khel
 Duma khel

Location
Zarobi is situated on the right bank of the river Abaseen (Indus River) in the southeast of District Swabi (Pakhtunkhwa), five miles from Tarbela dam in the west and in the south its border with Attock District, and east south border with Ghazi Tehsil of District Haripur (Hazara).

Nearby villages: Topi, Kotha, Kalabat, Marghuz, Garh Dhok Yousafi, Batakara, Garai, Sheenkay, Chhachh (Attock) Qazipur, Hasanpur, Ghazi.

Zarobai is the remnant of village Munara eroded by a dreadful flood in the past in June 1841 AD. The inhabitants of Munara were used to face horrible accidents and incidents with great tolerance and dare caused by the unruly River Indus.

History
Zarobai is the continuation of the historical village Munara which was once existed at the coast of Indus (Abaseen river) and then destroyed two times in Indus floods. After that crucial incident the people of that destroyed village were brought together at Zarobai derai and later it was named just Zarobai.

When the partition of the whole territory belonging to the Pashtoons was taking place among-st their tribes by Shiekh Milli's partition rule, our ancestors were given their part/portion at Munara but it was a small village and their share was much greater which was impossible to be given here so they got their remaining portion at Trapakai (now included in Tarbela Dam) and Pajman.

Munara (which was already a built up village at the north bank river Indus) was an historical place; its name has been mentioned in the battles fought between Yousafzai and Dalazak tribes time by time and other historic references, which describes its importance.

The battle between Gaju Khan (yousafzai) and Malik Bhai Khan (Dalazak) which lasted for depreciation of Dalazaks was fought somewhere near Munara. The defeatist Dalazak tribe escaped to the opposite side(south bank of river Indus i.e. Church Valley) across water.

The old village was actually a little to the west of present village at a distance of about a kilometer  whose archives are still present.

In 1841 a record snow fell, which blocked the whole way of water in river Indus, and by melting the huge  rocks of ice, there might be a fierce flood which would definitely cause destruction. Therefore, the people living on both sides of the Indus were made aware of the situation. The government servants went to every village for appropriate preparation, but the time was short. At last that happened of which every one was afraid. The biggest stormy flood in the history of Indus valley, made a big loss of lives and great destruction to the property. The majority were made safe due to pre-storm actions and instructions.

All the dynasties of the village shifted to the place where the now called Zarobai and the then called Derai exist.

There are also some information about some families who shifted to Ghur Ghishto (Church Valley, District Attock) before possible flood and some children and younger ones flee to the nearby villages in that tumult. Some baby girls were later discovered in village Marghuz, but one may not agree with it, because there is no authentic proof of it.

The place where Zarobai existed was a big knoll/hillock which was much safer from flood, and therefore the people felt no hesitation to be settled there. Those people were very prudent and farsighted, hence they gave the village a model shape, also made possible arrangements and prepared plans for future, which is why it doesn't seem like a village but a model town.

Name
Some research scholars belonging to this village have researched up to some how but more work is going on, regarding this matter. Some believe that this Zarobai, Zarobay or Zarobi is in accordance with Sarobai, Sarobay or Sarobi in Afghanistan, but later a letter Z or S changed in both either in Zarobai or Sarobai. Maybe the people living here and there have some conformity of tribes. There are many villages in East Pukhtonkhwa which are similar in names to the towns and cities either in West Pukhtonkhwa or in Hindustan. All these haven't happened in hurry/accident, it may have a background but unfortunately underground. What may however the fact, but Afghanistan is the mother land of all Pashtoon tribes living in every corner of the globe.

In the beginning the people of Munara were very weak, they were very short in strength but soon they realize their weakness and loneliness, therefore requested the head of Yousafzai tribe in Swat, he sent some fight master families for their help with whom they (people of Munara) shared their properties. That's why Chamliwal who came from Chamla, Swat have greater properties then other. Also some others families migrated from other places and settled here. That's why its population graph is so much higher. With the passage of time Yousafzai and Mandan were intermixed and it is impossible now to distinguish between them. There is a little quantity of other people known as Raghalya, but they are countless. The whole people count themselves as Yousafzai even Mandan because all have been intermixed and promiscuous. But they have authentic proofs of genealogical table and hence write Yousafzai with their names.

Islami School (The Historical School of Zarobai)

History of Azad schools in Pakhtunkhwa
Abdul Ghaffar Khan dearly known as Baacha Khan, who back in 1920 used education as a means for social transformation and established a chain of more than seventy schools in the North West Frontier Province (NWFP) making the local community an integral part of his educational program. This effort was initiated at a time when there was a dire need of purposeful and quality educational system that was both easily accessible and catered to the social, cultural and developmental needs of the Pakhtoons. It was a challenging effort; however, Baacha Khan made it possible by involving the local community, stirring up in them a sense of responsibility for collective effort and self-reliance. This endeavor proved fruitful in as far as it remained unobstructed by the oppressive British colonial forces.

Azad Islami School Zarobai

Bacha Khan the founder of the educational movement in Pakhtoonkhwa formed 100 Azad Islamic schools during his educational movement. He came to the village Zarobai (Swabi) in a series of his tours to different villages and towns and he formed this school here as well named Azad islami school, later the name changed to Islami School Zarobi. Mulana Abdul Ghafoor sb faregh Deoband was the 1st in charge/Headmaster of the Azad school Zarobai. This Islamic school contains 1200 students which is having co education until 5th class. This school is running in two shifts. The morning shift is for general education and the evening shift is for Islamic teaching i.e. Nazira Quran, translation, Islamic books etc. This school is run by the Jirga of zarobi village.the school income comes from different sources like charity, Qurbanai sarmane, Jirga Nagha amount (penalty amount) this amount is being paid by those who violate the rules of Bela (forest of Abaseen).

References

Populated places in Swabi District
Union Councils of Swabi District